St George's Cathedral is an Anglican church in  Windhoek, Namibia. The current incumbent is Hugh Prentice.
There is a school attached to the cathedral.

References 

Cathedrals in Namibia